The San Francisco Bay View National Black Newspaper is an online and print newspaper, published in San Francisco, California. It covers events from an African-American perspective, with a focus on Black liberation and coverage of worldwide racial inequality and political repression. The newspaper's distribution in its print edition extends to the larger San Francisco Bay Area and it is mailed to subscribers, including prisoners, across the United States.  Its name refers to the Bayview-Hunters Point neighborhood.

From its founding in 1976, the print edition was published weekly. However, it stopped printing weekly editions in 2008 due to funding shortfalls facing newspapers across the nation but publishes a much anticipated monthly issue by the first week of each month.

References

External links

 

African-American newspapers
Newspapers published in the San Francisco Bay Area
Publications established in 1976
1976 establishments in California